The Rebel is a 1932 German historical drama film directed by Curtis Bernhardt, Edwin H. Knopf, and Luis Trenker and starring Trenker, Luise Ullrich, and Victor Varconi. The film's art direction was by Fritz Maurischat. It was made by the German subsidiary of Universal Pictures, with location shooting in Austria and St. Moritz, Switzerland. Interior scenes were filmed at the Tempelhof Studios. A separate English language version The Rebel was released the following year. The film is part of the Mountain film genre.

Trenker stated that the film's plotline of a Tyrolean mountaineer Severin Anderlan leading a revolt against occupying French forces in 1809, during the Napoleonic Wars. The greatest Tirolean patriot Andreas Hofer was a proto-type of "Severin Anderlan" (both died in the same year!).. Trenker was designed to mirror what was happening in contemporary Germany as it rejected the terms of the Treaty of Versailles. In 1933 there was published Luis Trenker's novel, Der Rebell. Ein Freiheitsroman aus den Bergen Tirols.

Trenker later made a second film about the Tyrolean Rebellion The Fire Devil in 1940.

Cast

References
Notes

Bibliography

External links

1932 films
1930s historical drama films
German historical drama films
Films of the Weimar Republic
1930s German-language films
Films directed by Curtis Bernhardt
Films directed by Edwin H. Knopf
Films directed by Luis Trenker
Films set in Austria
Films shot in Austria
Films set in the Alps
Films set in 1809
Napoleonic Wars films
Mountaineering films
Films produced by Joe Pasternak
German multilingual films
Films shot at Tempelhof Studios
German black-and-white films
1932 multilingual films
Universal Pictures films
1932 drama films
1930s German films